Songxi railway station is a railway station in Songxi County, Nanping, Fujian, China. It is an intermediate stop on the Quzhou–Ningde railway and was opened with the line on 27 September 2020. It is nder the jurisdiction of China Railway Nanchang Group.

References 

Railway stations in Fujian
Railway stations in China opened in 2020